Plaistow (or  ) is an area of south-east London located in the London Borough of Bromley and, until 1965, in the historic county of Kent. It is located south of Downham and Grove Park and north of Sundridge Park and Bromley. Nowadays Plaistow overlaps somewhat with Sundridge, for example the main Sundridge Park shopping parade by the station sits directly east of Plaistow Green, with business and facilities in the area using the two names interchangeably. Plaistow now refers especially to the area north of Sundridge Park station along Burnt Ash Lane, part of the A2212 road which runs north to south between Grove Park and Bromley.

History

The area is first mentioned in 1278, and is thought to refer to games that were played here. Much of the area was purchased by the banker Peter Thellusson in 1777, and he built Plaistow Lodge here as his home (now converted into Parish Church of England Primary School and listed at grade II*). An iron church was later built besides the lodge in 1875. Housing development by the People's Freehold Land Society began after the arrival of the railway in 1878 (later rebuilt in 1896).  St Mary's Church was consecrated in 1863 and enlarged three times between 1881 and 1900. The churchyard closed for burials in 1893 when Plaistow Cemetery opened. In 1926 a wall was built along Valeswood Road after complaints by local residents that 'vulgar' working class persons from the Downham estate were cutting through the area on their way to Bromley town centre. The wall remained in place for roughly 10 years.

Gallery

References

Areas of London
Districts of the London Borough of Bromley